Lynda Myles (born July 22, 1939) is a television writer, actress, playwright, memoirist, and short fiction writer. She had attended Michigan State University and is known for her Broadway plays such as Two Gentlemen of Verona, Iphigenia in Aulis, No Exit, Rocking Chair, Trojan Women and Neil Simon's Plaza Suite.

Career

Actress
Myles made her Broadway debut in Neil Simon's Plaza Suite with Maureen Stapleton and George C. Scott.

As an actress, Ms. Myles was featured as George Washington's friend Sally Fairfax in the David L. Wolper's TV drama The World Turned Upside Down opposite her first husband Jan Leighton.

Writer
Her first play Wives was selected for the Eugene O'Neill National Playwright's Conference at the Eugene O'Neill Theater Center in 1979 and was performed at Theatre Row.

Her short story A Lucky Man was featured in the inaugural issue of The Creative Writer, the book series from J.D. Vine Publications. As a playwright, her play Thirteen has been performed in New York and at the ACT Theatre in Seattle.

Myles has written for General Hospital, Santa Barbara, Guiding Light, As the World Turns, Loving, and One Life to Live.

Myles is an editor and contributor to TheMemoirGroup.com.

Personal life
Myles was married to actor Jan Leighton. They had a daughter, Hallie Leighton.

Awards and nominations
Two Daytime Emmy Awards, Santa Barbara
Six Daytime Emmy Award Nominations, Santa Barbara
Writers Guild of America Award for Scriptwriting
2007: John Gardner Memorial Prize for Fiction for short story The Blue Dress

References

External links

Lynda Myles at Broadway World

1939 births
Living people
American actresses
American dramatists and playwrights
American memoirists
American television writers
21st-century American women writers